Mvouti is a district in the Kouilou Region of far south-western Republic of the Congo. The capital lies at Mvouti.

Towns and villages

Kouilou Department
Districts of the Republic of the Congo